White Tiger was a glam metal band from United States, founded by former Kiss band member Mark St. John, together with David Donato, along with bassist Michael Norton and drummer Brian James Fox, they recorded only two albums, Donato played in Black Sabbath in 1985, while St. John had been in Kiss in 1984. The rest of band was formed by bassist Michael Norton (brother of St. John) and Fox. The band broke up because of problems with the record label due to failed contracts and their new music but they had respectable success with their two albums. Mark died some time later at the age of 51. Donato died in February 2021.

Biography

The beginning  
St. John (Mark Norton), practiced as a guitar teacher before being contacted by Kiss in 1984, after being recommended by well-known guitar maker Grover Jackson, to replace Vinnie Vincent, who had just been fired from the band. From this period, Norton became known to the public under the name on Mark St. John. With Kiss, St. John participated in the recordings of the album Animalize (Kiss's best-selling album of the 80s), but in December of the same year, after having participated in three dates of the world tour, he was replaced by Bruce Kulick for health reasons as he had contracted a rare form of arthritis.

Donato, instead, joined Black Sabbath in 1984 to replace Ian Gillan, and was fired in 1985 after recording some demos with the band, after just six months, for reasons that are not fully understood. Prior to this experience Donato, who had previously worked as a model, had been a member of the British Armageddon (but based in Los Angeles) in the mid-1970s, with which he recorded a self-titled debut in 1975, before the death of its founder Keith Relf (former lead singer of The Yardbirds). After these, he joined the band Hero founded by Neil Citron who was briefly guitarist for Quiet Riot.

White Tiger

Creation of White Tiger 
White Tiger was formed in early 1986 by St. John, his brother Michael Norton, Donato, and drummer Brian James Fox. The bandbore some similarity in appearance and sound to the eighties-era hair metal Kiss. A few months later, after signing with ECM Records, they released the self-titled debut White Tiger, which while receiving praise related to songwriting, was nevertheless criticized for its poor production. In any case, it was not a significant success and went unnoticed, also because it was produced by a small label. The label, which saw no promising future for the quartet, rejected the band for lack of success. Demonstrations were recorded for a possible second album, which should have been titled On The Prowl, but was never released due to a lost record deal.

The End 
The project, seeing no future, was interrupted in 1989. St. John founded the band Keep composed of St. John, singer Michael McDonald (the pseudonym Michael Donato used), guitarist Kevin Russell, bassist Joey Mudarri and on drums none other than Peter Criss , a well-known former drummer of Kiss . After briefly switching bass with Jim Barnes, St. John reintroduced his brother Michael in January 1990. This incarnation of Keep, which included almost all the members of White Tiger, recorded some demos and attended some concerts in California. However, the label began to distance itself from the newborn band, also due to the rise of the grunge movement. That radically changed the musical trends of the time. Subsequently, the band disbanded in 1991 when Peter Criss founded his solo project called "Criss".

Later years

Raw reunion and launch
St. John later worked with Stevie Wonder and David Hasselhoff. Brother Michael Norton joined the Laidlaw band releasing the albums Sample This (1998) and First Big Picnic (1999). Later, Fox joined Silent Rage, ironically signing with the label owned by Gene Simmons, known as Kiss bassist and founding member. With them, the drummer released the album Still Alive in 2002. In 1998, St. John hired a small label to release the album White Tiger Raw which was released in 1999. After playing for a few dates in Los Angeles, the band finally broke up. In the same 1999 the debut of White Tiger was reissued with the addition of a bonus track. St. John will then undertake his solo project called "Mark St. John Project" first recording the eponymous EP Mark St. John Project in 1999 in which he participated in the composition of some Peter Criss songs , and then in 2003 the second Magic Bullet theory.

St. John was reported to have died on April 5, 2007 of a brain hemorrhage. He was 51 years old.

Rare demo tape of White Tiger sold 
A rare 1988 demo tape from White Tiger, Mark St. John's band, was sold on eBay for $ 608.00. Songs included are Wild Wild Women, Communicator, Where Did Our Love Go, and Face the Love.

Live video posts 
Brian James Fox, former drummer of White Tiger, Mark St. John's band, has announced that he is working on old material of the group recorded live (he has not specified if in audio or video) to publish it on Facebook and YouTube.

Discography

Studio albums
 1986 - White Tiger
 1999 - Raw

Compilations
 Rock Warriors
 Live to Rock

Live
 1987 - Live in Anaheim

Track list

White Tiger
"Rock Warriors" - 5:28
"Love/Hate" - 5:51
"Bad Time Coming" - 6:01
"Runaway" - 5:00
"Still Standing Strong" - 5:26
"Live To Rock" - 4:09
"Northern Wind" - 5:13
"Stand And Deliver" - 4:38
"White Hot Desire" - 4:36

Raw
Do You Want Me 		
You're the One 		
Small Dose of Lovin' 		
What Ya Doin' 		
Day of the Dog 		
Lord of the Fire 		
Love Me or Leave Me 		
She's the Kind of Girl 		
Razor Rock 		
Brother the Devil 		
I'm a Lover		
Pull It Tight		
Love Me or Leave Me [keyboard version] 		
Baby (Somethin' About You) 		
Out Rockin' 		
Makin' Love 		
Fallin' in Love 		
You're Breakin' My Heart 		
Interlude/Little Pussy [instrumental] 		
Big Cat Strut [instrumental]

Members
David Donato - lead vocals
Mark St. John - guitars, backing vocals
 Michael Norton - bass, backing vocals
Brian James Fox - drums, backing vocals

References

Glam metal musical groups from California
Hard rock musical groups from California
Sibling musical groups